PhysicsBowl is a national physics competition coordinated by the American Association of Physics Teachers (AAPT).  The test is taken during the first half of April each year by approximately 10,000 physics students.  Competitors must attempt 40 physics-related multiple choice questions in a 45 minute long time period.  First-year physics students take the Division I test, while second-year physics students take the Division II test.  The test can be administered physically on paper, but it is now also offered digitally by the online instructional application WebAssign.

History
Originally based on the American Chemical Society's general chemistry test, PhysicsBowl was used as an external benchmark for physics teachers to assess student performance starting in 1983.  The contest was first administered nationally in 1985 as the "Metrologic Exam," named after its original sponsor, and was renamed to "Physics Bowl" in 1990.  In 2002, the test expanded to include a second division.  Division I students complete questions 1 through 40, while Division II students complete questions 11-50. The Division 2 contest contains more difficult questions and is made for students with advanced conceptual understanding of physics. Students participating in the Division 2 contest usually take more than a year of physics while students who participate in the Division 1 contest usually take a year or less of physics.  Thus the whole test is 50 questions long, but each student must only complete 40, and the middle 30 questions overlap between divisions.

2017 Physics Bowl Winners: Division 1

2017 Physics Bowl Winners: Division 2

2016 Physics Bowl Winners: Division 1

2016 Physics Bowl Winners: Division 2

2015 Physics Bowl Winners: Division 1

2015 Physics Bowl Winners: Division 2

After calculating scores, question difficulty was used as a tie-breaker to determine ranks for students with same scores.

Scoring
The top ten overall students from each division, as well as the first and second place students in each of 14 geographic regions, are reported each year once the tests are all scored (note that all advanced, magnet, or other special science schools are placed in region one, and therefore do not compete in their geographic regions).  The top school team scores are also calculated and reported as the sum of the scores of the top five competing students from that school.  The average score, out of 40 points, for the 2014 exam was 17.5 points (43.8%) for Division I and 15.7 points (39.3%) for Division II.

See also
 American Physical Society (APS)
 International Physics Olympiad (IPhO)
 United States National Physics Olympiad

References

American Association of Physics Teachers
Physics competitions
Science events in the United States